Mood Muzik 4: A Turn 4 The Worst is the 4th and latest installment to the Mood Muzik series by rapper Joe Budden.

Background
During an interview, Joe Budden stated that Mood Muzik 4 would be "less dark" than the previous installments. A pre-order of an autographed copy is also available for purchase. 
During the recording process, three trailers were released to promote the mixtape. 
Snippets of '1000 Faces' and 'Black Cloud' are heard on the first and second trailers respectively, and 'Stuck in the Moment' is featured on the third and final trailer. The mixtape was released for retail sale on November 9, 2010. The mixtape was re-released as Mood Muzik 4.5 on May 24, 2011 with 7 previously unreleased tracks. Producer J. Cardim handles most of the production for the tape. The art direction of Mood Muzik 4.5 was handled by Brett Lindzen.

Commercial performance
The mixtape debuted at number 94 on the Billboard 200 and has since sold 13,500 copies.

Track listing

References

2010 mixtape albums
Joe Budden albums
Sequel albums
Albums produced by Just Blaze
Albums produced by Scott Storch